Ljubičić is a South Slavic family name that may refer to:

 Dragoljub Ljubičić (b. 1962), Serbian actor and humorist
 Ivan Ljubičić (b. 1979), Croatian tennis player
 Krešo Ljubičić (b. 1988), Croatian footballer
 Marin Ljubičić (b. 1988), Croatian footballer
 Marin Ljubičić (b. 2002), Croatian footballer
 Marko Ljubičić (b. 1987), Serbian basketball player
 Neven Ljubičić (b. 1963), Croatian physician and former health minister from 2005 to 2008
 Nikola Ljubičić (1916–2005), Serbian communist politician and general of the Yugoslav People's Army

Croatian surnames
Serbian surnames
Slavic-language surnames
Patronymic surnames